Corps colour[s] may refer to:

 Corps colours (Waffen-SS)
 Corps colours of the Luftwaffe (1935–1945) 
 Corps colours of the Sturmabteilung
 Corps colours of the German Army (1935–1945)
 Corps colours (NPA)
 Corps colours (Austria)

Color in culture